AMDH may refer to:

 Association Malienne des Droits de l'Homme, a Malian human rights NGO
 Association marocaine des droits humains, a Moroccan human rights NGO
 Association Mauritanienne des Droits de l'Homme, a Mauritanian human rights NGO
 Academia Mexicana de Derechos Humanos, a Mexican human rights NGO